The Royal Conservatory of Ghent (Dutch: Koninklijk Conservatorium Gent) is a royally chartered musical institution. It is now a part of the University College Ghent.

History
The Royal Conservatory of Ghent is a royally chartered musical institution, founded in 1835 under Leopold I of Belgium. The conservatory's founding director was Martin-Joseph Mengal. Other directors have included well known Belgian composers such as Adolphe Samuel and Émile Mathieu. The current dean is Filip Rathé.

It is one of four conservatories in Flanders and eight in Belgium. In addition to classical instrumental and vocal studies, it offers degrees in jazz, pop, music production, composition and instrument building. 

The Royal Conservatory offers Bachelor's and Master's degrees (including an English Master's degree in music), and an Advanced Master of Contemporary Music. The school also offers post-graduate degrees in music as well as a European Postgraduate in Arts in Sound.

The school traditionally attaches great importance to the practice of chamber music. Since 2006, the school has mounted an annual opera production. The school has two main performance venues, the Miry Concert Hall and Club Telex. 

In 1995, the Royal Conservatory was one of sixteen Belgian institutions merged into the University College Ghent. It provides training for about 480 students, with master's programs for drama and for music. 

Since 2011, together with the Royal Academy of Fine Arts (KASK) it forms part of the School of Arts of the University College Ghent. 

Notable students and faculty at the conservatory have included François-Auguste Gevaert, who studied directly under Mengal in 1841, Paul-Henri-Joseph Lebrun, who studied here and became a professor, and Edouard Potjes, who served as professor of piano for 22 years.

Notable alumni 
 Julien Paul Blitz
 Dirk Brossé
 François-Auguste Gevaert
 Lucien Goethals
 Walter Hus
 Karel Miry
 Karel Paukert
 Annelies Van Parys
 Jane Vignery

Directors
 Martin-Joseph Mengal 1835-1851
 Jean Andries 1798-1872
 Adolphe Samuel 1871-1898
  Emile Mathieu 1898-1924
 Martin Lunssens 1924-1936
 Jules-Toussaint de Sutter 1936-1954
 Léon Torck 1954-1968
 Gabriël Verschraegen 1968-1981
 Johan Huys 1981-1997
 Jan Rispens 1997-2009
 Maarten Weyler 2009-2011

Assistant Directors
 Karel Miry 1871-1889

Supervisors
 Victor Van den Hecke de Lembeke 1855-1870
 Gustave Louis Marie De Burbure De Wesembeek 1870-1871

Deans of the School of Arts, University College Ghent
 Wim de Temmerman 2011-2019
 Lars Kwakkenbos 2019-2020
 Filip Rathé 2021-

References

External links 
 KASK & Conservatory

Education in Ghent
Drama schools in Belgium
Music schools in Belgium
Educational institutions established in 1835
Culture of Ghent
Organisations based in Belgium with royal patronage
1835 establishments in Belgium